This was the first election in Maine since its separation from Massachusetts. In the previous election, Massachusetts had had 20 representatives. Seven seats (representing the -) were reassigned from Massachusetts to Maine. In addition, under the terms of the law which admitted Maine to the union, any vacancies in the 16th Congress by Representatives elected to represent Massachusetts but residing in the new states of Maine would be filled by a resident of Maine. John Holmes, who had been elected to the House for the former  was elected as one of the first two senators for Maine. The vacancy was filled in a special election by Joseph Dane (Federalist). Dane was the only Representative officially considered as representing Maine in the 16th Congress. The Representatives from the 15th-20th districts were still classified as being from Massachusetts for the remainder of the 16th Congress.

Maine elected its members November 7, 1820.  Maine law required a majority to win election necessitating additional ballots if a majority was not received so additional ballots were held January 22, 1821 and September 10, 1821, after the term began but before the new Congress convened.

See also 
 1820 Maine's at-large congressional district special election
 1820 and 1821 United States House of Representatives elections
 List of United States representatives from Maine

References 

United States House of Representatives elections in Maine
Maine
Maine
United States House of Representatives
United States House of Representatives